Gandaki may refer to:
Gandaki Province, a province of Nepal
Gandaki Rural Municipality, a rural municipality in Nepal
Gandaki River, Nepal and India
Gandaki Zone, a former administrative zone in Nepal

See also
 Gandak, Kohgiluyeh and Boyer-Ahmad, a village in Iran
 Gandak, Tehran, a village in Iran
 Burhi Gandak River, a tributary of the Ganges